Peter Jonas Bergius (13 July 1730 – 10 July 1790) was a Swedish medical doctor and botanist.

In 1758 Bergius was elected a member of the Royal Swedish Academy of Sciences. In 1768 he was elected to membership of the American Philosophical Society. He was elected a Fellow of the Royal Society in 1770  and a Foreign Honorary Member of the American Academy of Arts and Sciences in 1785.

Works

References

1730 births
1790 deaths
People from Ljungby Municipality
Swedish botanists
18th-century Swedish physicians
Fellows of the American Academy of Arts and Sciences
Members of the Royal Swedish Academy of Sciences
Fellows of the Royal Society
Members of the Göttingen Academy of Sciences and Humanities